A-Town Blues is the fourth studio album by the American country musician Wayne Hancock, released in 2001.

Production
The album was recorded at Cedar Creek Studios, in Austin, Texas, and was produced by Lloyd Maines. It was Hancock's intention to make a simpler, less-produced album. The band only minimally rehearsed the songs, and laid down the tracks in 20 hours; the results were mixed in two days. A-Town Blues was made with Hancock's road band. Many of the songs are about travel, highway pilgrimages, and the road.

Critical reception
The Austin Chronicle wrote that the album "swings like crazy, there's some top-notch playing, and Hancock certainly knows his way around a country-blues song." The Los Angeles Times thought that "the music is vibrant, as shimmering steel and chattering electric guitars dance over swinging bass lines." The Columbus Dispatch wrote that "Hancock's tunes bring home the bacon with the stylistic accuracy of the old honky-tonk masters."

Track listing
 "A-Town Blues" – 1:48
 "Man Of The Road" - 2:29
 "Sands Of Time" - 2:53
 "Miller, Jack & Mad Dog" - 2:06
 "Track 49" - 2:48
 "Life's Lonesome Road" - 1:43
 "Cow Cow Boogie" - 3:54
 "Route 23" - 2:34
 "Happy Birthday Julie" - 2:54
 "California Blues" - 4:05
 "Every Time" - 3:25
 "Viper" (Stuff Smith) - 3:10 
 "We Three" - 4:14
 "Railroad Blues" - 4:05

Personnel 

Dave Biller – guitar
Wayne Hancock – vocals
Ricardo Ramírez – bass
Jeremy Wakefield – steel guitar

See also
 2001 in music

References

External links
 Wayne "The Train" Hancock's Official web site  
 Wayne Hancock on rockabilly.net 
 Wayne Hancock collection at the Internet Archive's live music archive

Wayne Hancock albums
2001 albums
Bloodshot Records albums